Buenavista is a town and municipality located in the Sucre Department, northern Colombia.

External links
 Gobernacion de Sucre - Buenavista
 Buenavista official website
 Buenavista official website 2

References

Sucre